Jangy-Aryk is a village in Jalal-Abad Region of Kyrgyzstan. It is part of the Nooken District. Its population was 5,859 in 2021.

Population

References

Populated places in Jalal-Abad Region